The ACE Cougar was a type of midibus built by Alternative Chassis Engineering (ACE) in England in the early 1990s. It did not prove successful and only two were built.

Details
The ACE Cougar was designed to use Leyland National components wherever this was possible. The chassis was powered by a 6-cylinder rear in-line mounted Perkins Phaser turbo engine coupled to an Allison automatic transmission and air suspension. Both models built were 10.5m long and 2.3m wide.

Production and operations

The Cougar was built in ACE's factory in Huddersfield being launched in October 1990. The first Cougar was bodied by Wadham Stringer and sold to People's Provincial in 1990. Provincial director James Freeman saw the vehicle as a possible replacement for the company's large fleet of Leyland Nationals, but in the event only one was delivered. It was the only full-size bus bought new by Provincial as an independent company following privatisation in 1987. Provincial was taken over by First Hampshire & Dorset in 1995, the Cougar remaining in service until 2004. It has been preserved.

The second carried Willowbrook Warrior bodywork (a body rarely applied to new vehicles). It was completed in 1991 and was initially painted in a demonstrator livery, but was sold to West Midlands independent Caves Bus Services later in the year. Caves closed down in June 1999 and the Cougar was sold to a private owner on Valentia Island.

Intended developments
Both Cougars built were technically described as ACE Cougar V models. This was to differentiate them from the Cougar VI, a 12m variant which Alternative Chassis Engineering intended to build for sale to London Regional Transport. The company also intended to create 30 manufacturing jobs producing the vehicles. However, ACE went out of business in late 1991, having produced no further vehicles of any sort.

References

External links
Provincial Society: restoring the first ACE Cougar

Buses of the United Kingdom
Midibuses
Step-entrance buses
Vehicles introduced in 1990